The white-breasted whistler (Pachycephala lanioides) is a species of bird in the family Pachycephalidae.
It is endemic to Australia. Its natural habitat is subtropical or tropical mangrove forests.

Taxonomy and systematics
Alternate names for the white-breasted whistler include white-bellied thickhead and white-bellied whistler. The latter name  should not be confused with the species of the same name, Pachycephala leucogastra.

Subspecies
Three subspecies are recognized:
 P. l. carnarvoni - (Mathews, 1913): Found in coastal western Australia	
 P. l. lanioides - Gould, 1840: Found in coastal northwestern Australia	
 P. l. fretorum - De Vis, 1889: Originally described as a separate species. Found in coastal northern Australia

References

white-breasted whistler
Birds of the Northern Territory
Birds of Western Australia
Endemic birds of Australia
white-breasted whistler
Taxonomy articles created by Polbot